Yuly Isayevich Aykhenvald, Aikhenvald, or Eichenwald (24 January 1872 – 17 December 1928) was a Russian Jewish  literary critic who developed a native brand of Aestheticism. Russian-American author Vladimir Nabokov called Aykhenvald "a Russian version of Walter Pater".

Life
Aykhenvald was born in Balta, Russian Empire into a rabbi's family and attended the New Russia University in Odessa, where he developed a lasting interest in Schopenhauer's ideas. After moving to Moscow in 1895, he employed a number of pen-names, including Yu. Ald and B. Kamenetsky.

Aykhenvald followed Schopenhauer in that art is irrational and that the essence of it can be reached only by dint of intuition. He panned most Russian literary critics for applying social and utilitarian criteria to literature and for producing political journalism in the guise of artistic criticism.

Following the Russian Revolution, and the publication of his essay 'Revolution: the leaders and the led' (Revoljucija: ee vozhdi i vedomye'), where he attacked Leon Trotsky personally, Aykhenvald was briefly arrested and then, in 1922, exiled to Germany  where he involved himself in several high-profile émigré publications, including the newspaper Rulj. His life was cut short by a tram accident in Berlin. He is buried in the Russian Orthodox cemetery in Tegel, Berlin.

Family
Lev Aikhenvald (1873–1954), his brother, psychiatrist, author of works on forensic psychiatric examination and organization of psychiatric care. 
Alexander Aikhenvald (1904–1941), his son, an economist and member of Bukharin's school
Boris Aikhenvald (1902-1938), his son, a translator and philosopher
 Tatiana Aikhenvald (1900-1963), his daughter, a well-known teacher of mathematics
Yury Aikhenvald (1928–1993), his grandson, a poet, a writer and a dissident
Alexandra Aikhenvald (born 1957), his great-granddaughter, a linguist
Natalia Shvedova (1916–2009), his natural daughter, a lexicographer and an expert on Russian syntax

Books
In his best-known book Silhouettes of Russian Writers (1909) Aykhenvald offers a series of memorable impressionistic sketches of major Russian authors and their works. His argument that Ivan Turgenev was a second-rate writer caused an outcry in the conservative literary circles.

Quotes
"There are no literary movements, only writers. There is no society, only individuals".

Online resources
Русское зарубежье (Золотая книга эмиграции) Первая треть XX века. Энциклопедический биографический словарь. М., 1997. 748 с. at apologetika.com
Русский биографический словарь at www.rulex.ru
Онлайн-энциклопедия Кругосвет at www.krugosvet.ru
Биографический указатель at www.hrono.ru

Notes

1872 births
1928 deaths
People from Balta, Ukraine
Ukrainian Jews
Russian literary critics
Jewish Ukrainian writers
Railway accident deaths in Germany
Ukrainian literary critics
Jewish Russian writers